Superman Red/Superman Blue refers to two different comic book storylines published by DC Comics featuring Superman.

Silver Age story
The original Superman-Red/Superman-Blue tale is an "Imaginary Story" that first appeared in Superman #162 (July 1963). The script was written by Leo Dorfman, with art by Curt Swan.

In the story, Superman is compelled to finish a list of unaccomplished goals, including the enlargement of the Bottle City of Kandor and eliminating crime and evil from Earth. In order to accomplish these goals, Superman invents a machine, powered by various types of Kryptonite, that will increase his intelligence. The machine works, increasing Superman's intelligence a hundredfold, but with the unexpected side effect of splitting Superman into twin beings, one outfitted in an all-red Superman costume and the other in an all-blue version. The twins name themselves Superman-Red and Superman-Blue.

The Supermen, using their enhanced intellects, first repair Brainiac's "enlarging ray". They then create a means to bring all the fragments of Krypton together, creating a "New Krypton" (eliminating all existing kryptonite in the process), and successfully enlarge Kandor on its surface, freeing its citizens from their bottle prison. At the urging of Lori Lemaris, the Supermen create an underwater world for the citizens of Atlantis and arrange an interstellar voyage to transport them to their new home. The two Supermen go on to create an "anti-evil" ray which can cure criminal tendencies in anyone. They place the ray into satellites in orbit around the Earth, curing not only villains such as Lex Luthor and Mr. Mxyzptlk, but reforming  Communists such as Nikita Khrushchev and Fidel Castro. The reformed Luthor goes on to invent a serum that cures all known diseases, which the Supermen put into the water supply. Supergirl then releases the Phantom Zone inmates, also reformed by the ray, and they immigrate to New Krypton in a spaceship provided by the Legion of Super-Heroes.

With nearly all of the world's problems solved, the two Supermen now have the opportunity to deal with personal matters. The split allows them to resolve the love triangle between Superman, Lois Lane, and Lana Lang. Superman-Red proposes to Lois, while Superman-Blue asks Lana to marry him. Each woman claims her own Superman, and they have a triple wedding: Superman-Blue and Lana, Superman-Red and Lois, and Lucy Lane marrying Jimmy Olsen (since Lucy need no longer wait for Lois to marry before she does). Red decides to live on New Krypton with Lois, renouncing his powers and raising a family, while Blue remains on Earth and retires to devote his life to scientific research and starting a Super-family of his own.

Superman-Red and Superman-Blue appeared again in a story written by Bob Rozakis and Paul Kupperberg and illustrated by Adrian Gonzales and Vince Colletta and first published in German in Superman Album #1 in West Germany in 1981. The story was published in English in 1982 in the oversized Superman Spectacular (an unnumbered one-shot in the United States but published as No. 1 in a series in the United Kingdom). In this story, red kryptonite causes Superman to be temporarily split into Superman-Red and Superman-Blue and the two Supermen battle Lex Luthor and Terra-Man.

Superman-Red and Superman-Blue appear in a panel in Infinite Crisis #5, when Alexander Luthor, Jr. is trying to fuse the many alternate Supermen.

Modern Age story
The second incarnation of Superman Red and Superman Blue began in a 1998 storyline. While temporarily deprived of the solar energy required to give him powers, Superman had developed energy-based abilities, which eventually forced him to adopt a blue and white containment suit to prevent the energy dispersing. While retaining most of his abilities, he could now also sense different kinds of energy, including the trail of radioactivity from a passing van, bolts of electricity and magnetic tractor beams rather than his original heat vision. He was also able to absorb the radiation, although this was incredibly painful. He also gained the ability to turn his powers "off", though this took time to control as he inadvertently fried a toaster at home. This switch to Clark Kent also left him as vulnerable as a normal human, which was a bit of a surprise to him when he stubbed his toe while answering the phone. 

In the Superman Red/Superman Blue one-shot (February 1998), a trap created by the Cyborg Superman working with Toyman, caused Superman to split into two beings who represented different aspects of his personality, though each believed himself to be the original. Superman Blue was the more cerebral entity, preferring to think his way out of situations and actually solve problems with his mind as well as his powers. Superman Red was more rash, but also more decisive, preferring action over taking the time to think. Over time, these two personalities grew more and more polarized and individual, to the point that neither entity wanted to become one Superman again.

Both Supermen deeply loved Lois Lane; unlike in the earlier Red/Blue story, there was not another love interest for one of the Supermen to pair up with. Instead, they fought over Lois' affections, each with almost no consideration for her feelings; Lois lost her tolerance for this and essentially kicked them both out of the house until they could figure out how to unite.

Perplexed, both Red and Blue flew to Antarctica to see if Kryptonian technology could solve the issue, but were met by a woman named Obsession, who had previously shown an incredible level of romantic lust for Superman. Then Maxima, another superpowered female admirer of Superman's (only this one was far more volatile), stepped in. While Obsession liked the idea of two Supermen, Maxima found the existence of two utterly unacceptable. A fight broke out between the women when Obsession offered to share them with the Amazon from Almerac, insulting Maxima's royal sensibilities. Superman Red and Superman Blue separated and reprimanded the combatants.

Following a battle with the Millennium Giants (Cabraca, Cerne and Sekhmet), the two Supermen merged and Superman returned to his normal powers and original costume. The new status quo was established in a special one-shot, Superman: Forever, in June 1998. The explanation is vague; Superman felt he was "rewarded" for saving the world, although he later claimed that he returned to normal when his electromagnetic energy dispersed.

Although Superman briefly returned to his electric-blue form when facing Brainiac-13 after he was apparently absorbed by Brainiac's energy conduits while trying to disrupt his power supply, this was revealed to be the result of Brainiac 2.5–Brainiac-13's past self, hiding in Lena Luthor to avoid being deleted by his future self–creating the electric Superman based on scans taken of Superman in that form, intercepting B-13's attempt to absorb Superman and uploading Superman's mind into the electric body to keep Brainiac-13 occupied while Superman's true body was restored in a LexCorp facility.

Superman Red appears in Superman/Batman #25 alongside an army of alternate Supermen and Batmen.

"Superman Red/Superman Blue" story arc
Superman Red/Superman Blue Special #1
Superman (vol. 2) #132
The Adventures of Superman #555
Superman: Man of Tomorrow #10
Action Comics #742
Superman: The Man of Steel #77
Superman (vol. 2) #133
The Adventures of Superman #556
Action Comics #743

"Millennium Giants" story arc
Aquaman (vol. 4) #43
Superman: The Man of Steel #78
Challengers of the Unknown (vol. 5) #15
Teen Titans (vol. 2) #19
Superman (vol. 2) #134
Supergirl (vol. 4) #20
Steel (vol. 2) #50
The Adventures of Superman #557
Action Comics #744
Superman: The Man of Steel #79
Superman (vol. 2) #135

The New 52
As a part of The New 52, in Action Comics (vol. 2) #13, the "Electric Blue" suit is shown inside a display case at the Fortress of Solitude.

DC Rebirth
The story arc "Superman Reborn" references Superman Red and Superman Blue by associating the New 52-era half of Superman with red and the older, other half with blue. The story concludes with the merging of both halves into one complete version of Superman whose history has been arranged from that of the halves.

Superman Blue appears in Dark Nights: Metal as a nightmare Superman hailing from the Dark Multiverse. He and two other nightmare Supermen attempt to stop Batman from rescuing the normal Superman but are unsuccessful in doing so.

In other media
 Superman Blue appears in the crossover comic JLA/Avengers, when time distortions cause members of both teams to change into different appearances they had over the years. He is shown defeating the Destroyer.
 Red and Blue Superman make an appearance in the Superman 75 Year Anniversary short.
 The Justice League Action episode "Superman Red vs Superman Blue" is inspired by the storyline. Lex Luthor created a Kryptonite weapon that was intended to destroy Superman, but instead split him as well as Wonder Woman, Batman, and Luthor himself into two halves: the evil Reds and good Blues. The Reds plotted to control the entire world, except for Luthor Red, who was actually good and helped return everything to normal.

References

Comics by Dan Jurgens
Comics by Louise Simonson
Superman